Megan Kathleen Cavanagh (born 1970/1971) is an attorney who was elected in November 2018 to become an associate justice of the Michigan Supreme Court with a term beginning in January 2019.

Biography
Cavanagh was born in Lansing, Michigan, and educated in the public schools. She was raised in a family immersed in state politics with Michael Cavanagh, her father, serving as Chief Justice of the Michigan Supreme Court from 1991 to 1995, and her uncle Jerome Cavanagh elected in the 1960s as Mayor of Detroit.

She attended the University of Michigan, graduating in 1993 with a Bachelor of Engineering degree, and earned her Juris Doctor from the Wayne State University Law School in 2000. After law school, she entered private practice and became a shareholder with Garan Lucow Miller P.C., where she specialized in appellate law. She served as a member of the Michigan Attorney Grievance Commission.

In the November 6, 2018 election Cavanagh won a seat when she received the second-most votes for the Supreme Court, receiving 25.2 percent of the vote, and unseating Kurtis T. Wilder who came in third. The Democratic Party endorsed her candidacy. She was the first person to join their parent as a member of the Michigan Supreme Court since 1857.

Personal life
Cavanagh lives in Birmingham, Michigan and has two daughters.

See also
 List of justices of the Michigan Supreme Court

References

External links
 Election campaign website
 Megan Cavanagh. Ballotpedia.com.

21st-century American lawyers
21st-century American judges
Justices of the Michigan Supreme Court
University of Michigan College of Engineering alumni
Wayne State University Law School alumni
Lawyers from Detroit
Michigan Democrats
Living people
1970s births
Year of birth uncertain
21st-century American women judges